James Lamberton (9 February 1877–1929) was an English footballer who played in the Football League for Bristol City, Bury and Clapton Orient.

References

1877 births
1929 deaths
People from Haslingden
English footballers
Association football defenders
English Football League players
Bury F.C. players
Crewe Alexandra F.C. players
Bristol City F.C. players
Telford United F.C. players
Stalybridge Rovers F.C. players
Leyton Orient F.C. players
Norwich City F.C. players
West Bromwich Albion F.C. players
Haslingden F.C. players